Tempus Nova is a Denver-based consulting firm that specializes in migrating large scale, on-premises email and messaging systems to cloud-based G Suite. Founded in 2001, Tempus Nova specializes in Google Enterprise Solutions, G Suite Implementations, custom application development, and cloud computing. The company provides implementation and deployment services for organizations seeking to move from on-premises solutions to G Suite Basic, Business, or Enterprise. Services include project management, technical support, training, change management, continuing support post-deployment, and custom application development. Tempus Nova works with both public and private enterprises to move their communications and collaboration to cloud-based technology.

Tempus Nova works with Google to provide services that reduce IT costs for companies utilizing the cloud. In 2011, the company partnered with the United States federal government to implement a cloud-based email system for the General Services Administration. 
The company was also responsible for migrating the state governments of Wyoming, Utah, and Colorado; the first three U.S. state governments to adopt G Suite. In addition to its partnerships with U.S. federal and state governments, Tempus Nova has worked with several major corporations to transfer legacy data to G Suite including the retail brand Kohl’s, the Comex Group, Avery Dennison, and Denny's.

Products 

Tempus Nova is the sole developer of the proprietary interoperability, connectivity, coexistence, migration, and archiving tools used in migrating Lotus Notes users to G Suite. The company  provides several enterprise software products used by government, universities, and large organizations. Notable products include:

novaConnect – a tool for synchronizing free/buy information between Google and Lotus Notes, which enables Free/Busy lookups between Lotus Notes and GMail.
novaMigrate – a server-side and self-service tool for migrating Lotus Notes email, calendar, contacts, mail-in databases, discussion databases, groups, document libraries, team rooms, and custom applications natively to Google Apps.
novaResourceSync – a tool for synchronizing room and resource schedule information between Lotus Notes and Google which enables users to schedule conference rooms while ensuring that rooms are never double booked.
novaAnalyzer – a data analysis tool that facilitates the migration process from Lotus Notes Applications to Google.

Partnerships 

Tempus Nova has developed partnerships with several organizations and solution providers. The company is a certified G Suite Reseller and Google Premier Partner, a Google Partner Advisory Board Member, a Google Cloud Transformation Partner, and a Salesforce Reseller. It is an IBM Premier Partner, Microsoft Certified Business Partner, CDW Partner, and exclusive GP Strategies partner, among others.
 Tempus Nova is also a GSA IT Schedule 70 Holder and a Statewide Internet Portal Authority (SIPA) Partner and Exclusive G Suite for Government Contract Holder.

References

External links

Companies based in Denver
Web service providers